Agostino Cassandra (1564–1623) was a Roman Catholic prelate who served as Bishop of Gravina di Puglia (1614–1623).

Biography
Agostino Cassandra was born in Castrofidardo, Italy.
He was appointed Bishop of Gravina di Puglia on 24 Nov 1614, during the papacy of Pope Paul V.
On 28 Dec 1614, he was consecrated bishop by Marcello Lante della Rovere, Bishop of Todi, with Ulpiano Volpi, Archbishop of Chieti, and Cesare Lippi, Bishop of Cava de' Tirreni, serving as co-consecrators. 
He served as Bishop of Gravina di Puglia until his death in Sep 1623.

References

External links and additional sources
 (for Chronology of Bishops) 
 (for Chronology of Bishops) 

17th-century Italian Roman Catholic bishops
Bishops appointed by Pope Paul V
1564 births
1623 deaths